William Yount (June 7, 1899 – August 23, 1972) was an American hurdler. He competed in the men's 110 metres hurdles at the 1920 Summer Olympics.

References

External links

1899 births
1972 deaths
Athletes (track and field) at the 1920 Summer Olympics
American male hurdlers
Olympic track and field athletes of the United States
Place of birth missing